The GWR 322 Class tank engines comprised six Great Western Railway outside-framed  steam locomotives, originally built by Beyer, Peacock and Company as 322 class tender engines, and subsequently rebuilt in 1878–85 as saddle tank locomotives by George Armstrong at Wolverhampton Works.

Numbering
They were numbered in sequence as 322–327, No. 323 having exchanged numbers with No. 359, No. 325 with No.337, and No. 327 with No. 366.

Rebuilding
From 1918 all apart from No. 324 became pannier tanks, when they were reboilered with Belpaire fireboxes. No. 322 was the only one ever to have a fully enclosed cab.

Use
They were principally stationed in the Birmingham/Wolverhampton area, and at Stourbridge, and including their previous existence as tender engines all ran over a million miles up to their withdrawal between 1921 and 1932.

References

0322
0-6-0ST locomotives
Railway locomotives introduced in 1878
Standard gauge steam locomotives of Great Britain
Scrapped locomotives
Rebuilt locomotives 
Freight locomotives